Bijwasan Assembly constituency is one of the 70 Delhi Legislative Assembly constituencies in Delhi. This constituency covers part of Dhulsiras, Vasant Kunj, Mahipalpur, Rangpuri, Nangal Dewat, Bijwasan, Samalkha, Bamnauli, Kapashera, Shahbad Mohammadpur, Rajnagar, Part of Dwarka.

Overview
Present geographical structure of Bijwasan constituency came into existence in 2008 as a part of the implementation of the recommendations of the Delimitation Commission of India constituted in 2002.
Bijwasan is part of South Delhi Lok Sabha constituency along with nine other Assembly segments, namely, Sangam Vihar, Ambedkar Nagar, Chhatarpur, Deoli, Kalkaji, Tughlakabad, Palam, Badarpur and Mehrauli.

Members of Legislative Assembly
Key

Election results

2020 
  
Source:2020
In 2020, Bijwasan legislative assembly constituency had total 2,01,630 electors. Total number of valid vote was 1,24,972. Aam Aadmi Party candidate Bhupinder Singh Joon won and became MLA from this seat. He secured total 57,271 votes. Bharatiya Janata Party candidate Sat Prakash Rana stood second with total 56,518 votes. He lost by 753 votes.
This was categorized as the most marginal victory as the number of votes difference was lowest(753).

2015 
 
Source:2015

2013 
 
Source:2003

2008 
  
Source:2008

References

Assembly constituencies of Delhi
Delhi Legislative Assembly